WebFinger is a protocol specified by the Internet Engineering Task Force IETF that allows for discovery of information about people and things identified by a URI. Information about a person might be discovered via an acct: URI, for example, which is a URI that looks like an email address.

WebFinger is specified as the discovery protocol for OpenID Connect, which is a protocol that allows one to more easily log in to various sites on the Internet.

The WebFinger protocol is used by the federated social networks, such as GNU social, Diaspora, or Mastodon, to discover users on federated nodes and pods, as well as the remoteStorage protocol.

As a historical note, the name "WebFinger" is derived from the old ARPANET Finger protocol, but it is a very different protocol designed for HTTP.

The protocol payload is represented in JSON format.

Example

Basic example with profile page and business card 
Client request:
GET /.well-known/webfinger?resource=acct%3Abob%40example.com HTTP/1.1
Host: example.com

Server response:
{
	"subject": "acct:bob@example.com",
	"aliases": [
		"https://www.example.com/~bob/"
	],
	"properties": {
		"http://example.com/ns/role": "employee"
	},
	"links": [{
			"rel": "http://webfinger.example/rel/profile-page",
			"href": "https://www.example.com/~bob/"
		},
		{
			"rel": "http://webfinger.example/rel/businesscard",
			"href": "https://www.example.com/~bob/bob.vcf"
		}
	]
}

Usage on Mastodon 
On Mastodon, any federated servers can look up users by sending a request to the WebFinger endpoint on other servers. Here is an example for the user@mastodon@mastodon.social:

Client request:GET /.well-known/webfinger?resource=acct%3AMastodon%40mastodon.social HTTP/1.1
Host: mastodon.socialServer response:{
    "subject": "acct:Mastodon@mastodon.social",
    "aliases": [
        "https://mastodon.social/@Mastodon",
        "https://mastodon.social/users/Mastodon"
    ],
    "links": [
        {
            "rel": "http://webfinger.net/rel/profile-page",
            "type": "text/html",
            "href": "https://mastodon.social/@Mastodon"
        },
        {
            "rel": "self",
            "type": "application/activity+json",
            "href": "https://mastodon.social/users/Mastodon"
        },
        {
            "rel": "http://ostatus.org/schema/1.0/subscribe",
            "template": "https://mastodon.social/authorize_interaction?uri={uri}"
        }
    ]
}

See also
 Authorization
 IndieAuth
 OpenID
 OpenID Connect
 WebID

References

External links 
 webfinger.net community site
 WebFinger information and open source software
 sabre/webfinger server implementation by sabre.io
 webfinger Cloudflare worker by Kurt Seifried

Internet protocols
2013 introductions